Cheshmeh Darreh (also known as Cheshmeh Darreh-ye Mīānī and Cheshmeh Darreh-ye Vosţá) is a village in Sornabad Rural District, Hamaijan District, Sepidan County, Fars Province, Iran. At the 2006 census, its population was 89, in 23 families.

References 

Populated places in Sepidan County